Peter Alex Wilson (October 9, 1885 – June 5, 1957) was a professional baseball pitcher. Wilson played in Major League Baseball for the New York Highlanders in 1908 and 1909. In 20 career games, he had a 9–8 record with a 3.26 ERA. He threw left-handed.

Wilson was born in Springfield, Massachusetts, and died in St. Petersburg, Florida.

External links

New York Highlanders players
Major League Baseball pitchers
Hartford Senators players
Troy Trojans (minor league) players
Meriden Hopes players
Baseball players from Massachusetts
1885 births
1957 deaths